The FC Istiklol 2022 season was Istiklol's fourteenth Tajik League season, of which they are defending Tajik League Champions, whilst they also participated in the Tajik Cup, Tajik Supercup and AFC Champions League.

Season events
On 18 January, Istiklol announced the appointment of Igor Cherevchenko their new Head Coach, on a one-year contract.

On 9 February, Istiklol announced the return of Alisher Dzhalilov and Ehson Panjshanbe, both on two-year contracts.

On 18 February, Istiklol announced the loan signing of Alidzhoni Ayni from Krasnodar-2 until the end of the season, and the signing of Amadoni Kamolov from Paracuellos Antamira to a two-year contract.

The following day, Salokhiddin Irgashev signed for Istiklol on a two-year contract from Metallurg Bekabad, with Sodikdzhon Kurbonov signing from Dynamo Dushanbe to a two-year contract on 20 February.

Squad

Transfers

In

Loans in

Out

Trial

Friendlies

TFF Cup

Preliminary round

Competitions

Overview

Tajik Supercup

Tajikistan Higher League

Regular season

Results summary

Results by round

Results

League table

Tajikistan Cup

AFC Champions League

Group stage

Squad statistics

References

External links 
 FC Istiklol Official Web Site

FC Istiklol seasons
Istiklol